The   was a government-operated horse ranch during he Edo Period of Japan, which operated to supply cavalry mounts for the Tokugawa shogunate. It was located in what is now part of the city of Kamagaya, Chiba Prefecture in the Kantō region of Japan. The location was designated a National Historic Site of Japan in 2007.

Overview
The Tokugawa shogunate established several horse ranches in the vicinity of Edo under its direct control in order to be assured of a reliable and constant supply of cavalry horses. These included several sites in Shimōsa Province, as well as a site in Awa Province and in  Suruga Province. The pastures in Shimōsa were located on the vast Kantō plain, and was historically pasture land from at least the late Heian period. It was from this area that Taira no Masakado and later Minamoto no Yoritomo obtained their cavalry horses. The Kogane Nakano pasture was established by Tokugawa Ieyasu in the Keicho period (1596-1615) and survived to the Meiji restoration of 1868. In the later half of the Edo Period, it consisted of five separate ranches: Takada, Ueno, Nakano, Shimono and Inzai. The Nakano ranch covered was is now much of the cities of Kashiwa, Matsudo, Kamagaya, Shiroi and Funabashi. This vast area was also used by Shogun Tokugawa Yoshimune as a hunting grounds for deer. Yoshimune gave especial attention to the Nakano and Shimono locations, and expanded operations from 1722. There was also a facility at the Nakano pastures for the immediate family of the Shogun to come for horse riding. The total area of the facility was 15,000 hectares by the end of the Edo Period. 

The horses raised on these ranches were wild horses allowed to roam freely in herds across the area. They were rounded up once a year to be broken for use by the military, with each horse farm having one capture site. The capture site at Nakano is still fairly well preserved, and was constructed in the Genbun era (1736 to 1746). The horses were driven into an enclosure surrounded by an earthen embankment with a height of three to five meters. Of the wild horses that were captured, three-year-old horses were trained for riding or were dismissed and sold off as farm or pack animals to the surrounding residents. Some were released back into the wild again after branding to identify which ranch they belonged to. The number of horses sold to commoners was very few, but provided a stable income for the ranch. The annual horse roundup  became a tourist event which drew many sightseers from Edo. 

The National Historic Site designation marker is located at the Nakano capture site, which is a five minute walk from Kita-Hatsutomi Station on the Shin-Keisei Electric Railway.

See also
List of Historic Sites of Japan (Chiba)

References

External links
Kamagaya city home page 
Chiba Prefecture tourism home page 

Edo period
Kamagaya
Historic Sites of Japan
History of Chiba Prefecture